Boxing competitions at the 2022 Bolivarian Games in Valledupar, Colombia was held from 25 to 30 June 2022 at the Parque de la Leyenda Vallenata Consuelo Araujo Noguera.

Medalists

Men

Women

Medal table

References

External links
Bolivarianos Valledupar 2022 Boxing

2022 Bolivarian Games
2022 in boxing